Kaliganj Upazila may refer to:
Kaliganj Upazila, Gazipur
Kaliganj Upazila, Jhenaidah
Kaliganj Upazila, Satkhira
Kaliganj Upazila, Lalmonirhat